Kampong Burong Lepas is a village in Brunei-Muara District, Brunei, on the outskirts of the capital Bandar Seri Begawan. The population was 395 in 2016. It is one of the villages within Mukim Kilanas. The postcode is BF1720. The village is under the responsibility of the village head of Kampong Bengkurong.

References 

Burong Lepas